This is a list of published International Organization for Standardization (ISO) standards and other deliverables. For a complete and up-to-date list of all the ISO standards, see the ISO catalogue.

The standards are protected by copyright and most of them must be purchased. However, about 300 of the standards produced by ISO and IEC's Joint Technical Committee 1 (JTC 1) have been made freely and publicly available.

ISO 12000 – ISO 12999
 ISO 12001:1996 Acoustics – Noise emitted by machinery and equipment – Rules for the drafting and presentation of a noise test code
 ISO 12005:2003 Lasers and laser-related equipment – Test methods for laser beam parameters – Polarization
 ISO 12006 Building construction – Organization of information about construction works
 ISO 12013:2012 Paints and varnishes — Determination of curing characteristics using a free damped oscillation method — 
 ISO/TS 12025:2012 Nano materials – Quantification of nano-object release from powders by generation of aerosols
 ISO/IEC 12042:1993 Information technology – Data compression for information interchange – Binary arithmetic coding algorithm
 ISO 12052:2017 Health informatics – Digital imaging and communication in medicine (DICOM) including workflow and data management
 ISO 12083:1994 Information and documentation - Electronic manuscript preparation and markup
 ISO 12085:1996 Geometrical Product Specifications (GPS) - Surface texture: Profile method - Motif parameters
 ISO/IEC 12087 Information technology - Computer graphics and image processing - Image Processing and Interchange (IPI) - Functional specification
 ISO/IEC 12087-1:1995 Part 1: Common architecture for imaging
 ISO/IEC 12087-2:1994 Part 2: Programmer's imaging kernel system application programme interface
 ISO/IEC 12087-3:1995 Part 3: Image Interchange Facility (IIF)
 ISO/IEC 12087-5:1998 Part 5: Basic Image Interchange Format (BIIF)
 ISO/IEC 12088-4:1995 Information technology - Computer graphics and image processing - Image processing and interchange - Application program interface language bindings
 ISO/IEC 12089:1997 Information technology - Computer graphics and image processing - Encoding for the Image Interchange Facility (IIF)
 ISO 12100 Safety of machinery – General principles for design – Risk assessment and risk reduction
 ISO/IEC 12139 Information technology – Telecommunications and information exchange between systems – Powerline communication (PLC) – High speed PLC medium access control (MAC) and physical layer (PHY)
 ISO/IEC 12097:2002 Road vehicles -- Airbag components
 ISO/IEC 12139-1:2009 Part 1: General requirements
 ISO 12163:1999 Dental baseplate/modelling wax [Withdrawn: replaced with ISO 15854]
 ISO 12164 Hollow taper interface with flange contact surface
 ISO 12164-1:2001 Part 1: Shanks — Dimensions
 ISO 12164-2:2001 Part 2: Receivers — Dimensions
 ISO 12164-3:2014 Part 3: Dimensions of shanks for stationary tools
 ISO 12164-4:2014 Part 4: Dimensions of receivers for stationary tools
 ISO 12165:2000 Tools for moulding - Components of compression and injection moulds and diecasting dies - Terms and symbols
 ISO 12176 Plastics pipes and fittings – Equipment for fusion jointing polyethylene systems
 ISO 12176-3:2011 Part 3: Operator's badge
 ISO 12179:2000 Geometrical Product Specifications (GPS) – Surface texture: Profile method – Calibration of contact (stylus) instruments
 ISO 12180 Geometrical product specifications (GPS) - Cylindricity
 ISO 12180-1:2011 Part 1: Vocabulary and parameters of cylindrical form
 ISO 12180-2:2011 Part 2: Specification operators
 ISO 12181 Geometrical product specifications (GPS) - Roundness
 ISO 12181-1:2011 Part 1: Vocabulary and parameters of roundness
 ISO 12181-2:2011 Part 2: Specification operators
 ISO/IEC TR 12182:2015 Systems and software engineering - Framework for categorization of IT systems and software, and guide for applying it
 ISO 12188 Tractors and machinery for agriculture and forestry – Test procedures for positioning and guidance systems in agriculture
 ISO 12188-1:2010 Part 1: Dynamic testing of satellite-based positioning devices
 ISO 12188-2:2012 Part 2: Testing of satellite-based auto-guidance systems during straight and level travel
 ISO 12189:2008 Implants for surgery – Mechanical testing of implantable spinal devices – Fatigue test method for spinal implant assemblies using an anterior support
 ISO 12199:2000 Alphabetical ordering of multilingual terminological and lexicographical data represented in the Latin alphabet
 ISO/IEC 12207 Systems and software engineering – Software life cycle processes
 ISO 12231:2012 Photography - Electronic still picture imaging - Vocabulary
 ISO 12242:2012 Measurement of fluid flow in closed conduits – Ultrasonic transit-time meters for liquid
 ISO/IEC 12246:1993 Information technology – 8 mm wide magnetic tape cartridge dual azimuth format for information interchange – Helical scan recording
 ISO/IEC 12247:1993 Information technology – 3,81 mm wide magnetic tape cartridge for information interchange – Helical scan recording – DDS format using 60 m and 90 m length tapes
 ISO/IEC 12248:1993 Information technology – 3,81 mm wide magnetic tape cartridge for information interchange – Helical scan recording – DATA/DAT-DC format using 60 m and 90 m length tapes
 ISO/TR 12300:2014 Health informatics – Principles of mapping between terminological systems
 ISO/TR 12309:2009 Health informatics – Guidelines for terminology development organizations
 ISO/TR 12310:2015 Health informatics – Principles and guidelines for the measurement of conformance in the implementation of terminological systems
 ISO 12353 Road vehicles – Traffic accident analysis
 ISO 12353-1:2002 Part 1: Vocabulary
 ISO/IEC TR 12382:1992 Permuted index of the vocabulary of information technology
 ISO 12417 Cardiovascular implants and extracorporeal systems – Vascular device-drug combination products
 ISO 12417-1:2015 Part 1: General requirements
 ISO 12543 Glass in building – Laminated glass and laminated safety glass
 ISO 12543-1:2011 Part 1: Definitions and description of component parts
 ISO 12615:2004 Bibliographic references and source identifiers for terminology work
 ISO 12616:2002 Translation-oriented terminography
 ISO 12620:2019 Management of terminology resources — Data category specifications 
 ISO 12625 Tissue paper and tissue products
 ISO 12625-1:2011 Part 1: General guidance on terms
 ISO 12637 Graphic technology - Vocabulary
 ISO 12637-1:2006 Part 1: Fundamental terms
 ISO 12637-2:2008 Part 2: Prepress terms
 ISO 12637-3:2009 Part 3: Printing terms
 ISO 12637-4:2008 Part 4: Postpress terms
 ISO 12639:2004 Graphic technology – Prepress digital data exchange – Tag image file format for image technology (TIFF/IT)
 ISO 12640 Graphic technology - Prepress digital data exchange
 ISO 12640-1:1997 Part 1: CMYK standard colour image data (CMYK/SCID)
 ISO 12640-2:2004 Part 2: XYZ/sRGB encoded standard colour image data (XYZ/SCID)
 ISO 12640-3:2007 Part 3: CIELAB standard colour image data (CIELAB/SCID)
 ISO 12640-4:2011 Part 4: Wide gamut display-referred standard colour image data [Adobe RGB (1998)/SCID]
 ISO 12640-5:2013 Part 5: Scene-referred standard colour image data (RIMM/SCID)
 ISO 12641:1997 Graphic technology – Prepress digital data exchange – Colour targets for input scanner calibration
 ISO 12641-1:2016 Part 1: Colour targets for input scanner calibration
 ISO 12642 Graphic technology - Input data for characterization of four-colour process printing
 ISO 12642-1:2011 Part 1: Initial data set
 ISO 12642-2:2006 Part 2: Expanded data set
 ISO 12651 Electronic document management - Vocabulary
 ISO 12651-1:2012 Part 1: Electronic document imaging
 ISO 12651-2:2014 Part 2: Workflow management
 ISO 12671:2012 Thermal spraying - Thermally sprayed coatings - Symbolic representation on drawings
 ISO 12706:2009 Non-destructive testing - Penetrant testing - Vocabulary
 ISO 12707:2016 Non-destructive testing - Magnetic particle testing - Vocabulary
 ISO 12716:2001 Non-destructive testing - Acoustic emission inspection - Vocabulary
 ISO 12718:2008 Non-destructive testing - Eddy current testing - Vocabulary
 ISO 12749 Nuclear energy, nuclear technologies, and radiological protection - Vocabulary
 ISO 12749-2:2013 Part 2: Radiological protection
 ISO 12749-3:2015 Part 3: Nuclear fuel cycle
 ISO 12749-4:2015 Part 4: Dosimetry for radiation processing
 ISO 12756:2016 Drawing and writing instruments - Ball point pens and roller ball pens - Vocabulary
 ISO 12757 Ball point pens and refills
 ISO 12757-2:1998 Part 2: Documentary use (DOC)
 ISO 12764:2017 Measurement of fluid flow in closed conduits – Flowrate measurement by means of vortex shedding flowmeters inserted in circular cross-section conduits running full
 ISO/TR 12767:2007 Measurement of fluid flow by means of pressure differential devices – Guidelines on the effect of departure from the specifications and operating conditions given in ISO 5167
 ISO/TR 12773 Business requirements for health summary records
 ISO/TR 12773-1:2009 Part 1: Requirements
 ISO/TR 12773-2:2009 Part 2: Environmental scan
 ISO 12780 Geometrical product specifications (GPS) - Straightness
 ISO 12780-1:2011 Part 1: Vocabulary and parameters of straightness
 ISO 12780-2:2011 Part 2: Specification operators
 ISO 12781 Geometrical product specifications (GPS) - Flatness
 ISO 12781-1:2011 Part 1: Vocabulary and parameters of flatness
 ISO 12781-2:2011 Part 2: Specification operators
 ISO/IEC 12785 Information technology - Learning, education, and training - Content packaging
 ISO/IEC 12785-1:2009 Part 1: Information model
 ISO/IEC 12785-2:2011 Part 2: XML binding
 ISO/IEC TR 12785-3:2012 Part 3: Best practice and implementation guide
 ISO 12789 Reference radiation fields - Simulated workplace neutron fields
 ISO 12789-1:2008 Part 1: Characteristics and methods of production
 ISO 12789-2:2008 Part 2: Calibration fundamentals related to the basic quantities
 ISO/TR 12802:2010 Nanotechnologies - Model taxonomic framework for use in developing vocabularies - Core concepts
 ISO/TS 12805:2011 Nanotechnologies – Materials specifications – Guidance on specifying nano-objects
 ISO 12812 Core banking – Mobile financial services
 ISO 12812-1:2017 Part 1: General framework
 ISO/TS 12812-2:2017 Part 2: Security and data protection for mobile financial services
 ISO/TS 12812-3:2017 Part 3: Financial application lifecycle management
 ISO/TS 12812-4:2017 Part 4: Mobile payments-to-persons
 ISO/TS 12812-5:2017 Part 5: Mobile payments to businesses
 ISO 12813:2015 Electronic fee collection – Compliance check communication for autonomous systems
 ISO 12836:2015 Dentistry - Digitizing devices for CAD/CAM systems for indirect dental restorations - Test methods for assessing accuracy
 ISO/TR 12845:2010 Selected illustrations of fractional factorial screening experiments
 ISO 12855:2015 Electronic fee collection – Information exchange between service provision and toll charging
 ISO 12858 Optics and optical instruments – Ancillary devices for geodetic instruments
 ISO 12858-1:2014 Part 1: Invar levelling staffs
 ISO 12858-2:1999 Part 2: Tripods
 ISO 12858-3:2005 Part 3: Tribrachs
 ISO/TR 12859:2009 Intelligent transport systems – System architecture – Privacy aspects in ITS standards and systems
 ISO/IEC TR 12860:2009 Information technology – Telecommunications and information exchange between systems – Next Generation Corporate Networks (NGCN) – General
 ISO/IEC TR 12861:2009 Information technology – Telecommunications and information exchange between systems – Next Generation Corporate Networks (NGCN) – Identification and routing
 ISO/IEC 12862:2011 Information technology - 120 mm (8,54 Gbytes per side) and 80 mm (2,66 Gbytes per side) DVD recordable disk for dual layer (DVD-R for DL)
 ISO 12865:2006 Ophthalmic instruments – Retinoscopes
 ISO 12866:1999 Ophthalmic instruments – Perimeters
 ISO 12867:2010 Ophthalmic instruments – Trial frames
 ISO/TS 12869:2012 Water quality – Detection and quantification of Legionella spp. and/or Legionella pneumophila by concentration and genic amplification by quantitative polymerase chain reaction (qPCR)
 ISO 12870:2016 Ophthalmic optics – Spectacle frames – Requirements and test methods
 ISO/TR 12885:2008 Nanotechnologies – Health and safety practices in occupational settings relevant to nanotechnologies
 ISO/TR 12888:2011 Selected illustrations of gauge repeatability and reproducibility studies
 ISO 12891 Retrieval and analysis of surgical implants
 ISO 12891-1:2015 Part 1: Retrieval and handling
 ISO 12891-2:2014 Part 2: Analysis of retrieved surgical implants
 ISO/TS 12901 Nanotechnologies – Occupational risk management applied to engineered nanomaterials
 ISO/TS 12901-1:2012 Part 1: Principles and approaches
 ISO/TS 12901-2:2014 Part 2: Use of the control banding approach
 ISO/IEC 12905:2011 Integrated circuit cards – Enhanced terminal accessibility using cardholder preference interface
 ISO 12912:2014 Circular knitting machines – Vocabulary
 ISO 12913 Acoustics – Soundscape
 ISO 12913-1:2014 Part 1: Definition and conceptual framework
 ISO 12931:2012 Performance criteria for authentication solutions used to combat counterfeiting of material goods
 ISO 12944 Paints and varnishes – Corrosion protection of steel structures by protective paint systems
 ISO 12967 Health informatics – Service architecture
 ISO 12967-1:2009 Part 1: Enterprise viewpoint
 ISO 12967-2:2009 Part 2: Information viewpoint
 ISO 12967-3:2009 Part 3: Computational viewpoint
 ISO 12999 Acoustics – Determination and application of measurement uncertainties in building acoustics
 ISO 12999-1:2014 Part 1: Sound insulation

ISO 13000 – ISO 13999
 ISO 13006:2012 Ceramic tiles – Definitions, classification, characteristics and marking
 ISO 13007 Ceramic tiles – Grouts and adhesives
 ISO 13007-1:2014 Terms, definitions and specifications for adhesives
 ISO 13007-2:2010 Test methods for adhesives
 ISO 13007-3:2010 Terms, definitions and specifications for grouts
 ISO 13007-4:2013 Test methods for grouts
 ISO 13008:2012 Information and documentation - Digital records conversion and migration process
 ISO 13009:2015 Tourism and related services – Requirements and recommendations for beach operation
 ISO/TR 13014:2012 Nanotechnologies – Guidance on physico-chemical characterization of engineered nanoscale materials for toxicologic assessment
 ISO/TR 13028:2010 Information and documentation - Implementation guidelines for digitization of records
 ISO 13053 Quantitative methods in process improvement - Lean and Six Sigma
 ISO 13053-1:2011 Part 1: DMAIC methodology
 ISO 13053-2:2011 Part 2: Tools and techniques
 ISO/TR 13054:2012 Knowledge management of health information standards
 ISO/TR 13062:2015 Electric mopeds and motorcycles – Terminology and classification
 ISO/IEC 13066 Information technology - Interoperability with assistive technology (AT)
 ISO/IEC 13066-1:2011 Part 1: Requirements and recommendations for interoperability
 ISO/IEC TR 13066-2:2016 Part 2: Windows accessibility application programming interface (API)
 ISO/IEC TR 13066-3:2012 Part 3: IAccessible2 accessibility application programming interface (API)
 ISO/IEC TR 13066-4:2015 Part 4: Linux/UNIX graphical environments accessibility API
 ISO/IEC TR 13066-6:2014 Part 6: Java accessibility application programming interface (API)
 ISO 13078 Dentistry - Dental furnace
 ISO 13078-2:2016 Part 2: Test method for evaluation of furnace programme via firing glaze
 ISO 13102:2012 Geometrical product specifications (GPS) – Dimensional measuring equipment: Electronic digital-indicator gauge – Design and metrological characteristics
 ISO 13105 Building construction machinery and equipment – Machinery for concrete surface floating and finishing
 ISO 13105-1:2014 Part 1: Terms and commercial specifications
 ISO 13111 Intelligent transport systems (ITS) – The use of personal ITS station to support ITS service provision for travellers
 ISO 13111-1:2017 Part 1: General information and use case definitions
 ISO 13119:2012 Health informatics – Clinical knowledge resources – Metadata
 ISO 13120:2013 Health informatics – Syntax to represent the content of healthcare classification systems – Classification Markup Language (ClaML)
 ISO/TR 13121:2011 Nanotechnologies – Nanomaterial risk evaluation
 ISO 13127:2012 Packaging - Child resistant packaging - Mechanical test methods for reclosable child resistant packaging systems
 ISO/TR 13128:2012 Health Informatics – Clinical document registry federation
 ISO/TS 13131:2014 Health informatics – Telehealth services – Quality planning guidelines
 ISO/TS 13136:2012 Microbiology of food and animal feed – Real-time polymerase chain reaction (PCR)-based method for the detection of food-borne pathogens – Horizontal method for the detection of Shiga toxin-producing Escherichia coli (STEC) and the determination of O157, O111, O26, O103 and O145 serogroups
 ISO 13140 Electronic fee collection – Evaluation of on-board and roadside equipment for conformity to ISO 13141
 ISO 13140-1:2016 Part 1: Test suite structure and test purposes
 ISO 13140-2:2016 Part 2: Abstract test suite
 ISO 13141:2015 Electronic fee collection – Localisation augmentation communication for autonomous systems
 ISO 13142:2015 Electro-optical systems – Cavity ring-down technique for high-reflectance measurement
 ISO 13143 Electronic fee collection – Evaluation of on-board and roadside equipment for conformity to ISO 12813
 ISO 13143-1:2016 Part 1: Test suite structure and test purposes
 ISO 13143-2:2016 Part 2: Abstract test suite
 ISO/TR 13154:2017 Medical electrical equipment – Deployment, implementation and operational guidelines for identifying febrile humans using a screening thermograph
 ISO/IEC 13156:2011 Information technology – Telecommunications and information exchange between systems – High rate 60 GHz PHY, MAC and PALs
 ISO/IEC 13157 Information technology – Telecommunications and information exchange between systems – NFC Security
 ISO/IEC 13157-1:2014 Part 1: NFC-SEC NFCIP-1 security services and protocol
 ISO/IEC 13157-2:2016 Part 2: NFC-SEC cryptography standard using ECDH and AES
 ISO/IEC 13157-3:2016 Part 3: NFC-SEC cryptography standard using ECDH-256 and AES-GCM
 ISO/IEC 13157-4:2016 Part 4: NFC-SEC entity authentication and key agreement using asymmetric cryptography
 ISO/IEC 13157-5:2016 Part 5: NFC-SEC entity authentication and key agreement using symmetric cryptography
 ISO 13160:2012 Water quality - Strontium 90 and strontium 89 - Test methods using liquid scintillation counting or proportional counting
 ISO 13161:2011 Water quality - Measurement of polonium 210 activity concentration in water by alpha spectrometry
 ISO 13162:2011 Water quality - Determination of carbon 14 activity - Liquid scintillation counting method
 ISO 13163:2013 Water quality - Lead-210 - Test method using liquid scintillation counting
 ISO 13164 Water quality - Radon-222
 ISO 13164-1:2013 Part 1: General principles
 ISO 13164-2:2013 Part 2: Test method using gamma-ray spectrometry
 ISO 13164-3:2013 Part 3: Test method using emanometry
 ISO 13164-4:2015 Part 4: Test method using two-phase liquid scintillation counting
 ISO 13165 Water quality - Radium-226
 ISO 13165-1:2013 Part 1: Test method using liquid scintillation counting
 ISO 13165-2:2014 Part 2: Test method using emanometry
 ISO 13165-3:2016 Part 3: Test method using coprecipitation and gamma-spectrometry
 ISO 13167:2015 Water quality - Plutonium, americium, curium and neptunium - Test method using alpha spectrometry
 ISO/IEC 13170:2009 Information technology - 120 mm (8,54 Gbytes per side) and 80 mm (2,66 Gbytes per side) DVD re-recordable disk for dual layer (DVD-RW for DL)
 ISO 13175 Implants for surgery – Calcium phosphates
 ISO 13175-3:2012 Part 3: Hydroxyapatite and beta-tricalcium phosphate bone substitutes
 ISO 13179 Implants for surgery – Plasma-sprayed unalloyed titanium coatings on metallic surgical implants
 ISO 13179-1:2014 Part 1: General requirements
 ISO 13183:2012 Intelligent transport systems – Communications access for land mobiles (CALM) – Using broadcast communications
 ISO 13184 Intelligent transport systems (ITS) – Guidance protocol via personal ITS station for advisory safety systems
 ISO/TR 13184-1:2013 Part 1: General information and use case definitions
 ISO 13184-2:2016 Part 2: Road guidance protocol (RGP) requirements and specification
 ISO 13185 Intelligent transport systems – Vehicle interface for provisioning and support of ITS services
 ISO/TR 13185-1:2012 Part 1: General information and use case definition
 ISO 13185-2:2015 Part 2: Unified gateway protocol (UGP) requirements and specification for vehicle ITS station gateway (V-ITS-SG) interface
 ISO/IEC 13187:2011 Information technology - Server management command line protocol (SM CLP) specification
 ISO/TR 13195:2015 Selected illustrations of response surface method - Central composite design
 ISO 13200:1995 Cranes - Safety signs and hazard pictorials - General principles
 ISO 13203:2005 Chains, sprockets and accessories - List of equivalent terms
 ISO/IEC 13210:1999 Information technology - Requirements and Guidelines for Test Methods Specifications and Test Method Implementations for Measuring Conformance to POSIX Standards
 ISO/IEC 13211 Information technology - Programming languages - Prolog
 ISO/IEC 13211-1:1995 Part 1: General core
 ISO/IEC 13211-2:2000 Part 2: Modules
 ISO 13212:2014 Ophthalmic optics – Contact lens care products – Guidelines for determination of shelf-life
 ISO/IEC 13213:1994 Information technology - Microprocessor systems - Control and Status Registers (CSR) Architecture for microcomputer buses
 ISO 13225:2012 Geometrical product specifications (GPS) – Dimensional measuring equipment; Height gauges – Design and metrological characteristics
 ISO/IEC TR 13233:1995 Information technology - Interpretation of accreditation requirements in ISO/IEC Guide 25 - Accreditation of Information Technology and Telecommunications testing laboratories for software and protocol testing services
 ISO/IEC 13235 Information technology - Open Distributed Processing - Trading function
 ISO/IEC 13235-1:1998 Specification
 ISO/IEC 13235-3:1998 Part 3: Provision of Trading Function using OSI Directory service
 ISO/IEC 13236:1998 Information technology - Quality of service: Framework
 ISO/IEC 13238 Information technology – Data Management
 ISO/IEC 13238-3:1998 Part 3: IRDS export/import facility
 ISO/IEC 13239:2002 Information technology – Telecommunications and information exchange between systems – High-level data link control (HDLC) procedures
 ISO/IEC 13240:2001 Information technology - Document description and processing languages - Interchange Standard for Multimedia Interactive Documents (ISMID)
 ISO/IEC 13241:1997 Information technology – Telecommunications and information exchange between systems – Private Integrated Services Network – Inter-exchange signalling protocol – Route Restriction Class additional network feature
 ISO/IEC 13242:1997 Information technology – Telecommunications and information exchange between systems – Private Integrated Services Network – Specification, functional model and information flows – Route Restriction Class additional network feature
 ISO/IEC 13244:1998 Information technology - Open Distributed Management Architecture
 ISO/IEC 13246:1997 Information technology – Telecommunications and information exchange between systems – Broadband Private Integrated Services Network – Inter-exchange signalling protocol – Signalling ATM adaptation layer
 ISO/IEC 13247:1997 Information technology – Telecommunications and information exchange between systems – Broadband Private Integrated Services Network – Inter-exchange signalling protocol – Basic call/connection control
 ISO/IEC 13249 Information technology – Database languages – SQL multimedia and application
 ISO/IEC 13249-1:2016 Part 1: Framework
 ISO/IEC 13249-2:2003 Part 2: Full-Text
 ISO/IEC 13249-3:2016 Part 3: Spatial
 ISO/IEC 13249-5:2003 Part 5: Still image
 ISO/IEC 13249-6:2006 Part 6: Data mining
 ISO/IEC TS 13249-7:2013 Part 7: History
 ISO/IEC 13250 Information technology – Topic Maps
 ISO/IEC 13251:2004 Collection of graphical symbols for office equipment
 ISO/IEC 13252:1999 Information technology – Enhanced communications transport service definition
 ISO 13261 Sound power rating of air-conditioning and air source heat pump equipment
 ISO 13261-1:1998 Part 1: Non-ducted outdoor equipment
 ISO 13261-2:1998 Part 2: Non-ducted indoor equipment
 ISO 13274:2013 Packaging - Transport packaging for dangerous goods - Plastics compatibility testing for packaging and IBCs
 ISO/TS 13278:2011 Nanotechnologies – Determination of elemental impurities in samples of carbon nanotubes using inductively coupled plasma mass spectrometry
 ISO 13289:2011 Recreational diving services – Requirements for the conduct of snorkelling excursions
 ISO 13293:2012 Recreational diving services – Requirements for gas blender training programmes
 ISO 13300 Sensory analysis – General guidance for the staff of a sensory evaluation laboratory
 ISO 13300-1:2006 Part 1: Staff responsibilities
 ISO 13300-2:2006 Part 2: Recruitment and training of panel leaders
 ISO 13304 Radiological protection - Minimum criteria for electron paramagnetic resonance (EPR) spectroscopy for retrospective dosimetry of ionizing radiation
 ISO 13304-1:2013 Part 1: General principles
 ISO 13307:2013 Microbiology of food and animal feed – Primary production stage – Sampling techniques
 ISO 13320:2009 Particle size analysis - Laser diffraction methods
 ISO 13325:2003 Tyres – Coast-by methods for measurement of tyre-to-road sound emission
 ISO/TR 13329:2012 Nanomaterials – Preparation of material safety data sheet (MSDS)
 ISO 13332:2000 Reciprocating internal combustion engines – Test code for the measurement of structure-borne noise emitted from high-speed and medium-speed reciprocating internal combustion engines measured at the engine feet
 ISO/IEC 13346 Information technology – Volume and file structure of write-once and rewritable media using non-sequential recording for information interchange
 ISO/IEC 13346-1:1995 Part 1: General
 ISO/IEC 13346-2:1999 Part 2: Volume and boot block recognition
 ISO/IEC 13346-3:1999 Part 3: Volume structure
 ISO/IEC 13346-4:1999 Part 4: File structure
 ISO/IEC 13346-5:1995 Part 5: Record structure
 ISO 13347 Industrial fans – Determination of fan sound power levels under standardized laboratory conditions
 ISO 13347-1:2004 Part 1: General overview
 ISO 13347-2:2004 Part 2: Reverberant room method
 ISO 13347-3:2004 Part 3: Enveloping surface methods
 ISO 13347-4:2004 Part 4: Sound intensity method
 ISO 13349:2010 Fans - Vocabulary and definitions of categories
 ISO 13356:2015 Implants for surgery – Ceramic materials based on yttria-stabilized tetragonal zirconia (Y-TZP)
 ISO 13370 Thermal performance of buildings – Heat transfer via the ground – Calculation methods
 ISO 13372:2012 Condition monitoring and diagnostics of machines - Vocabulary
 ISO 13373 Condition monitoring and diagnostics of machines – Vibration condition monitoring
 ISO 13373-1:2002 Part 1: General procedures
 ISO 13373-2:2016 Part 2: Processing, analysis and presentation of vibration data
 ISO 13373-3:2015 Part 3: Guidelines for vibration diagnosis
 ISO 13373-7:2017 Part 7: Diagnostic techniques for machine sets in hydraulic power generating and pump-storage plants
 ISO 13373-9:2017 Part 9: Diagnostic techniques for electric motors
 ISO 13374 Condition monitoring and diagnostics of machine systems – Data processing, communication and presentation
 ISO 13374-1:2003 Part 1: General guidelines
 ISO 13374-2:2007 Part 2: Data processing
 ISO 13374-3:2012 Part 3: Communication
 ISO 13374-4:2015 Part 4: Presentation
 ISO 13379 Condition monitoring and diagnostics of machines – Data interpretation and diagnostics techniques
 ISO 13379-1:2012 Part 1: General guidelines
 ISO 13379-2:2015 Part 2: Data-driven applications
 ISO 13381 Condition monitoring and diagnostics of machines – Prognostics
 ISO 13381-1:2015 Part 1: General guidelines
 ISO 13385 Geometrical product specifications (GPS) – Dimensional measuring equipment
 ISO 13385-1:2011 Part 1: Callipers; Design and metrological characteristics
 ISO 13385-2:2011 Part 2: Calliper depth gauges; Design and metrological characteristics
 ISO 13399 Cutting tool data representation and exchange
 ISO 13399-1:2006 Part 1: Overview, fundamental principles and general information model
 ISO/TS 13399-2:2014 Part 2: Reference dictionary for the cutting items
 ISO/TS 13399-3:2014 Part 3: Reference dictionary for tool items
 ISO/TS 13399-4:2014 Part 4: Reference dictionary for adaptive items
 ISO/TS 13399-5:2014 Part 5: Reference dictionary for assembly items
 ISO/TS 13399-50:2013 Part 50: Reference dictionary for reference systems and common concepts
 ISO/TS 13399-60:2014 Part 60: Reference dictionary for connection systems
 ISO/TS 13399-70:2016 Part 70: Graphical data layout - Layer setting for tool layout
 ISO/TS 13399-71:2016 Part 71: Graphical data layout - Creation of documents for standardized data exchange: Graphical product information
 ISO/TS 13399-72:2016 Part 72: Creation of documents for the standardized data exchange - Definition of properties for drawing header and their XML-data exchange
 ISO/TS 13399-80:2017 Part 80: Creation and exchange of 3D models - Overview and principles
 ISO/TS 13399-100:2008 Part 100: Definitions, principles and methods for reference dictionaries
 ISO/TS 13399-150:2008 Part 150: Usage guidelines
 ISO/TS 13399-201:2014 Part 201: Creation and exchange of 3D models - Regular inserts
 ISO/TS 13399-202:2015 Part 202: Creation and exchange of 3D models - Irregular inserts
 ISO/TS 13399-203:2015 Part 203: Creation and exchange of 3D models - Replaceable inserts for drilling
 ISO/TS 13399-204:2016 Part 204: Creation and exchange of 3D models - Inserts for reaming
 ISO/TS 13399-301:2013 Part 301: Concept for the design of 3D models based on properties according to ISO/TS 13399-3: Modelling of thread-cutting taps, thread-forming taps and thread-cutting dies
 ISO/TS 13399-302:2013 Part 302: Concept for the design of 3D models based on properties according to ISO/TS 13399-3: Modelling of solid drills and countersinking tools
 ISO/TS 13399-303:2016 Part 303: Creation and exchange of 3D models - Solid end mills
 ISO/TS 13399-304:2016 Part 304: Creation and exchange of 3D models - Solid milling cutters with arbor hole
 ISO/TS 13399-305:2017 Part 305: Creation and exchange of 3D models - Modular tooling systems with adjustable cartridges for boring
 ISO/TS 13399-307:2016 Part 307: Creation and exchange of 3D models - End mills for indexable inserts
 ISO/TS 13399-308:2016 Part 308: Creation and exchange of 3D models - Milling cutters with arbor hole for indexable inserts
 ISO/TS 13399-309:2016 Part 309: Creation and exchange of 3D models - Tool holders for indexable inserts
 ISO/TS 13399-310:2017 Part 310: Creation and exchange of 3D models - Turning tools with carbide tips
 ISO/TS 13399-311:2016 Part 311: Creation and exchange of 3D models - Solid reamers
 ISO/TS 13399-312:2016 Part 312: Creation and exchange of 3D models - Reamers for indexable inserts
 ISO/TS 13399-401:2016 Part 401: Creation and exchange of 3D models - Converting, extending and reducing adaptive items
 ISO/TS 13399-405:2016 Part 405: Creation and exchange of 3D models - Collets
 ISO 13402:1995 Surgical and dental hand instruments – Determination of resistance against autoclaving, corrosion and thermal exposure
 ISO/IEC 13403:1995 Information technology - Information interchange on 300 mm optical disk cartridges of the write once, read multiple (WORM) type using the CCS method
 ISO 13404:2007 Prosthetics and orthotics – Categorization and description of external orthoses and orthotic components
 ISO 13405 Prosthetics and orthotics – Classification and description of prosthetic components
 ISO 13405-1:2015 Part 1: Classification of prosthetic components
 ISO 13405-2:2015 Part 2: Description of lower limb prosthetic components
 ISO 13405-3:2015 Part 3: Description of upper limb prosthetic components
 ISO 13406 Ergonomic requirements for work with visual displays based on flat panels
 ISO 13406-2:2001 Part 2: Ergonomic requirements for flat panel displays [withdrawn 2008-11-14]
 ISO 13407:1999 Human-centred design processes for interactive systems (This standard has been revised by ISO 9241-210:2010)
 ISO/IEC 13421:1993 Information technology – Data Interchange on 12,7 mm, 48-track magnetic tape cartridges – DLT 1 format
 ISO/IEC 13422:1994 Information technology – Data interchange on 90 mm Flexible Disk Cartridges 10 MByte capacity using sector servo tracking – ISO Type 304
 ISO 13444:2012 Technical product documentation (TPD) – Dimensioning and indication of knurling
 ISO 13448 Acceptance sampling procedures based on the allocation of priorities principle (APP)
 ISO 13448-1:2005 Part 1: Guidelines for the APP approach
 ISO 13448-2:2004 Part 2: Coordinated single sampling plans for acceptance sampling by attributes
 ISO 13450 Photography – 110-size cartridge, film and backing paper – Dimensions
 ISO/TS 13471 Acoustics – Temperature influence on tyre/road noise measurement
 ISO/TS 13471-1:2017 Part 1: Correction for temperature when testing with the CPX method
 ISO 13472 Acoustics – Measurement of sound absorption properties of road surfaces in situ
 ISO 13472-1:2002 Part 1: Extended surface method
 ISO 13472-2:2010 Part 2: Spot method for reflective surfaces
 ISO 13473 Characterization of pavement texture by use of surface profiles
 ISO 13473-1:1997 Part 1: Determination of Mean Profile Depth
 ISO 13473-2:2002 Part 2: Terminology and basic requirements related to pavement texture profile analysis
 ISO 13473-3:2002 Part 3: Specification and classification of profilometers
 ISO/TS 13473-4:2008 Part 4: Spectral analysis of surface profiles
 ISO 13473-5:2009 Part 5: Determination of megatexture
 ISO 13474:2009 Acoustics – Framework for calculating a distribution of sound exposure levels for impulsive sound events for the purposes of environmental noise assessment
 ISO 13475 Acoustics – Stationary audible warning devices used outdoors
 ISO 13475-1:1999 Part 1: Field measurements for determination of sound emission quantities
 ISO/TS 13475-2:2000 Part 2: Precision methods for determination of sound emission quantities
 ISO/IEC 13481:1993 Information technology - Data interchange on 130 mm optical disk cartridges - Capacity: 1 gigabyte per cartridge
 ISO 13482:2014 Robots and robotic devices – Safety requirements for personal care robots
 ISO 13485:2016 Medical devices – Quality management systems – Requirements for regulatory purposes
 ISO/IEC 13490 Information technology – Volume and file structure of read-only and write-once compact disk media for information interchange
 ISO/IEC 13490-1:1995 Part 1: General
 ISO/IEC 13490-2:1995 Part 2: Volume and file structure
 ISO 13491 Financial services – Secure cryptographic devices (retail)
 ISO 13491-1:2016 Part 1: Concepts, requirements and evaluation methods
 ISO 13491-2:2017 Part 2: Security compliance checklists for devices used in financial transactions
 ISO 13492:2007 Financial services – Key management related data element – Application and usage of ISO 8583 data elements 53 and 96
 ISO/TR 13519:2012 Guidance on the development and use of ISO statistical publications supported by software
 ISO/IEC 13522 Information technology - Coding of multimedia and hypermedia information
 ISO/IEC 13522-1:1997 Part 1: MHEG object representation - Base notation (ASN.1)
 ISO/IEC 13522-3:1997 Part 3: MHEG script interchange representation
 ISO/IEC 13522-4:1996 Part 4: MHEG registration procedure
 ISO/IEC 13522-5:1997 Part 5: Support for base-level interactive applications
 ISO/IEC 13522-6:1998 Part 6: Support for enhanced interactive applications
 ISO/IEC 13522-7:2001 Part 7: Interoperability and conformance testing for ISO/IEC 13522-5
 ISO/IEC 13522-8:2001 Part 8: XML notation for ISO/IEC 13522-5
 ISO 13528:2015 Statistical methods for use in proficiency testing by interlaboratory comparison
 ISO 13539:1998 Earth-moving machinery – Trenchers – Definitions and commercial specifications
 ISO/IEC 13549:1993 Information technology - Data interchange on 130 mm optical disk cartridges - Capacity: 1,3 gigabytes per cartridge
 ISO 13550:2002 Hydrometric determinations – Flow measurements in open channels using structures – Use of vertical underflow gates and radial gates
 ISO 13559:2002 Butter, fermented milks and fresh cheese – Enumeration of contaminating microorganisms – Colony-count technique at 30 degrees C
 ISO/IEC 13560:2009 Information technology – Telecommunications and information exchange between systems – Procedure for the registration of assigned numbers for ISO/IEC 26907 and ISO/IEC 26908
 ISO/IEC TR 13561:1994 Information technology - Guidelines for effective use of optical disk cartridges conforming to ISO/IEC 10090
 ISO 13565 Geometrical Product Specifications (GPS) - Surface texture: Profile method; Surfaces having stratified functional properties
 ISO 13565-1:1996 Part 1: Filtering and general measurement conditions
 ISO 13565-2:1996 Part 2: Height characterization using the linear material ratio curve
 ISO 13565-3:1998 Part 3: Height characterization using the material probability curve
 ISO 13567 Technical product documentation – Organization and naming of layers for CAD
 ISO/IEC 13568:2002 Information Technology – Z formal specification notation – Syntax, type system and semantics
 ISO/TR 13569:2005 Financial services – Information security guidelines
 ISO 13574:2015 Industrial furnaces and associated processing equipment - Vocabulary
 ISO/IEC 13575:1995 Information technology – Telecommunications and information exchange between systems – 50-pole interface connector mateability dimensions and contact number assignments
 ISO 13577 Industrial furnaces and associated processing equipment - Safety 
 ISO 13577-1:2016 Part 1: General requirements
 ISO 13577-2:2014 Part 2: Combustion and fuel handling systems
 ISO 13577-3:2016 Part 3: Generation and use of protective and reactive atmosphere gases
 ISO 13577-4:2014 Part 4: Protective systems
 ISO 13579 Industrial furnaces and associated processing equipment - Method of measuring energy balance and calculating efficiency
 ISO 13579-1:2013 General methodology
 ISO 13579-2:2013 Reheating furnaces for steel
 ISO 13579-3:2013 Batch-type aluminium melting furnaces
 ISO 13579-4:2013 Furnaces with protective or reactive atmosphere
 ISO/TS 13582:2015 Health informatics – Sharing of OID registry information
 ISO 13586:2000 Plastics - Determination of fracture toughness (GIC and KIC) – Linear elastic fracture mechanics (LEFM) approach
 ISO/TR 13587:2012 Three statistical approaches for the assessment and interpretation of measurement uncertainty
 ISO/IEC TR 13594:1995 Information technology – Lower layers security
 ISO 13606 Health informatics – Electronic health record communication
 ISO 13606-1:2008 Part 1: Reference model
 ISO 13606-2:2008 Part 2: Archetype interchange specification
 ISO 13606-3:2009 Part 3: Reference archetypes and term lists
 ISO/TS 13606-4:2009 Part 4: Security
 ISO 13606-5:2010 Part 5: Interface specification
 ISO 13611:2014 Interpreting - Guidelines for community interpreting
 ISO/IEC 13614:1995 Information technology - Interchange on 300 mm optical disk cartridges of the write once, read multiple (WORM) type using the SSF method
 ISO 13616 Financial services – International bank account number (IBAN)
 ISO 13628 Petroleum and natural gas industries – Design and operation of subsea production systems
 ISO 13628-1:2005 Part 1: General requirements and recommendations
 ISO 13628-2:2006 Part 2: Unbonded flexible pipe systems for subsea and marine applications
 ISO 13628-3:2000 Part 3: Through flowline (TFL) systems
 ISO 13628-4:2010 Part 4: Subsea wellhead and tree equipment
 ISO 13628-5:2009 Part 5: Subsea umbilicals
 ISO 13628-6:2006 Part 6: Subsea production control systems
 ISO 13628-7:2005 Part 7: Completion/workover riser systems
 ISO 13628-8:2002 Part 8: Remotely Operated Vehicle (ROV) interfaces on subsea production systems
 ISO 13628-9:2000 Part 9: Remotely Operated Tool (ROT) intervention systems
 ISO 13628-10:2005 Part 10: Specification for bonded flexible pipe
 ISO 13628-11:2007 Part 11: Flexible pipe systems for subsea and marine applications
 ISO 13628-15:2011 Part 15: Subsea structures and manifolds
 ISO/IEC 13642:1999 Information technology – Elements of management information related to the OSI Physical Layer
 ISO 13653:1996 Optics and optical instruments - General optical test methods - Measurement of relative irradiance in the image field
 ISO 13666:2012 Ophthalmic optics - Spectacle lenses - Vocabulary
 ISO/IEC 13673:2000 Information technology - Document processing and related communication - Conformance testing for Standard Generalized Markup Language (SGML) systems
 ISO 13687 Tourism and related services – Yacht harbours
 ISO 13687-1:2017 Part 1: Minimum requirements for basic service level harbours
 ISO 13687-2:2017 Part 2: Minimum requirements for intermediate service level harbours
 ISO 13687-3:2017 Part 3: Minimum requirements for high service level harbours
 ISO 13694:2015 Optics and photonics – Lasers and laser-related equipment – Test methods for laser beam power (energy) density distribution
 ISO 13695:2004 Optics and photonics – Lasers and laser-related equipment – Test methods for the spectral characteristics of lasers
 ISO 13696:2002 Optics and optical instruments – Test methods for radiation scattered by optical components
 ISO 13697:2006 Optics and photonics – Lasers and laser-related equipment – Test methods for specular reflectance and regular transmittance of optical laser components
 ISO 13702 Petroleum and natural gas industries - Control and mitigation of fires and explosions on offshore production installations - Requirements and guidelines
 ISO/IEC 13712 Information technology – Remote Operations
 ISO/IEC 13712-1:1995 Concepts, model and notation
 ISO/IEC 13712-2:1995 OSI realizations – Remote Operations Service Element (ROSE) service definition
 ISO/IEC 13712-3:1995 OSI realizations – Remote Operations Service Element (ROSE) protocol specification
 ISO/IEC 13714:1995 Information technology – Document processing and related communication – User interface to telephone-based services – Voice messaging applications
 ISO 13715:2017 Technical product documentation—Edges of undefined shape—Indication and dimensioning
 ISO 13716:1999 Dentistry — Reversible-irreversible hydrocolloid impression material systems [Withdrawn: replaced with ISO 21563]
 ISO/IEC 13719 Information technology - Portable Common Tool Environment (PCTE)
 ISO/IEC 13719-1:1998 Part 1: Abstract specification
 ISO/IEC 13719-2:1998 Part 2: C programming language binding
 ISO/IEC 13719-3:1998 Part 3: Part 3: Ada programming language binding
 ISO/IEC 13719-4:1998 Part 4: IDL binding (Interface Definition Language)
 ISO 13720:2010 Meat and meat products – Enumeration of presumptive Pseudomonas spp.
 ISO 13722:2017 Microbiology of the food chain – Enumeration of Brochothrix spp. – Colony-count technique
 ISO 13731:2001 Ergonomics of the thermal environment - Vocabulary and symbols
 ISO 13732 Ergonomics of the thermal environment – Methods for the assessment of human responses to contact with surfaces
 ISO 13732-1:2006 Part 1: Hot surfaces
 ISO/TS 13732-2:2001 Part 2: Human contact with surfaces at moderate temperature
 ISO/IEC 13751:2001 Information technology - Programming languages, their environments and system software interfaces - Programming language Extended APL
 ISO 13766:2006 Earth-moving machinery – Electromagnetic compatibility
 ISO 13779 Implants for surgery – Hydroxyapatite
 ISO 13779-2:2008 Part 2: Coatings of hydroxyapatite
 ISO 13779-3:2008 Part 3: Chemical analysis and characterization of crystallinity and phase purity
 ISO 13779-4:2002 Part 4: Determination of coating adhesion strength
 ISO 13779-6:2015 Part 6: Powders
 ISO 13781:2017 Implants for surgery – Homopolymers, copolymers and blends on poly(lactide) – In vitro degradation testing
 ISO 13782:1996 Implants for surgery – Metallic materials – Unalloyed tantalum for surgical implant applications
 ISO/IEC 13800:1996 Information technology - Procedure for the registration of identifiers and attributes for volume and file structure
 ISO 13810:2015 Tourism services – Industrial tourism – Service provision
 ISO/TS 13811:2015 Tourism and related services – Guidelines on developing environmental specifications for accommodation establishments
 ISO/IEC 13816:2007 Information technology - Programming languages, their environments and system software interfaces - Programming language ISLISP
 ISO/IEC 13817 Information technology - Programming languages, their environments and system software interfaces - Vienna Development Method - Specification Language
 ISO/IEC 13817-1:1996 Part 1: Base language
 ISO/IEC 13818 Information technology – Generic coding of moving pictures and associated audio information
 ISO/TS 13830:2013 Nanotechnologies – Guidance on voluntary labelling for consumer products containing manufactured nano-objects
 ISO 13837 Road vehicles – Safety glazing materials – Method for the determination of solar transmittance
 ISO/IEC TR 13841:1995 Information technology - Guidance on measurement techniques for 90 mm optical disk cartridges
 ISO/IEC 13842:1995 Information technology - 130 mm optical disk cartridges for information interchange - Capacity: 2 Gbytes per cartridge
 ISO 13843:2017 Water quality – Requirements for establishing performance characteristics of quantitative microbiological methods
 ISO 13849 Safety of machinery – Safety related parts of control systems
 ISO 13850:2015 Safety of machinery – Emergency stop function – Principles for design
ISO 13854:2017 Safety of machinery – Minimum gaps to avoid crushing of parts of the human body
 ISO 13855:2010 Safety of machinery – Positioning of safeguards with respect to the approach speeds of parts of the human body
 ISO 13860:2016 Machinery for forestry – Forwarders – Terms, definitions and commercial specifications
 ISO 13861:2000 Machinery for forestry – Wheeled skidders – Terms, definitions and commercial specifications
 ISO 13862:2000 Machinery for forestry – Feller-bunchers – Terms, definitions and commercial specifications
 ISO/IEC 13863:1998 Information technology – Telecommunications and information exchange between systems – Private Integrated Services Network – Specification, functional model and information flows – Path replacement additional network feature
 ISO/IEC 13864:1995 Information technology – Telecommunications and information exchange between systems – Private Integrated Services Network – Specification, functional model and information flows – Name identification supplementary services
 ISO/IEC 13865:2003 Information technology – Telecommunications and information exchange between systems – Private Integrated Services Network – Specification, functional model and information flows – Call Transfer supplementary service
 ISO/IEC 13866:1995 Information technology – Telecommunications and information exchange between systems – Private Integrated Services Network – Specification, functional model and information flows – Call completion supplementary services
 ISO/IEC 13868:2003 Information technology – Telecommunications and information exchange between systems – Private Integrated Services Network – Inter-exchange signalling protocol – Name identification supplementary services
 ISO/IEC 13869:2003 Information technology – Telecommunications and information exchange between systems – Private Integrated Services Network – Inter-exchange signalling protocol – Call Transfer supplementary service
 ISO/IEC 13870:2003 Information technology – Telecommunications and information exchange between systems – Private Integrated Services Network – Inter-exchange signalling protocol – Call Completion supplementary services
 ISO/IEC 13871:1995 Information technology – Telecommunications and information exchange between systems – Private telecommunications networks – Digital channel aggregation
 ISO/IEC 13872:2003 Information technology – Telecommunications and information exchange between systems – Private Integrated Services Network – Specification, functional model and information flows – Call Diversion supplementary services
 ISO/IEC 13873:2003 Information technology – Telecommunications and information exchange between systems – Private Integrated Services Network – Inter-exchange signalling protocol – Call Diversion supplementary services
 ISO/IEC 13874:2003 Information technology – Telecommunications and information exchange between systems – Private Integrated Services Network – Inter-exchange signalling protocol – Path Replacement additional network feature
 ISO/IEC 13886:1996 Information technology - Language-Independent Procedure Calling (LIPC)
 ISO/IEC 13888 Information technology - Security techniques - Non-repudiation
 ISO/IEC 13888-1:2009 Part 1: General
 ISO/IEC 13888-2:2010 Part 2: Mechanisms using symmetric
 ISO/IEC 13888-3:2009 Part 3: Mechanisms using asymmetric techniques
 ISO 13920:1996 Welding – General tolerances for welded constructions – Dimensions for lengths and angles – Shape and position
 ISO/IEC 13923:1996 Information technology – 3,81 mm wide magnetic tape cartridge for information interchange – Helical scan recording – DDS-2 format using 120 m length tape
 ISO 13926 Pen systems
 ISO 13926-1:2004 Part 1: Glass cylinders for pen-injectors for medical use
 ISO 13926-2:2011 Part 2: Plunger stoppers for pen-injectors for medical use
 ISO 13926-3:2012 Part 3: Seals for pen-injectors for medical use
 ISO 13940:2015 Health informatics – System of concepts to support continuity of care
 ISO 13943:2017 Fire safety - Vocabulary
 ISO 13958:2014 Concentrates for haemodialysis and related therapies
 ISO 13959:2014 Water for haemodialysis and related therapies
 ISO 13960:2010 Cardiovascular implants and extracorporeal systems – Plasmafilters
 ISO/IEC 13961:2000 Information technology - Scalable Coherent Interface (SCI)
 ISO/IEC 13962:1995 Information technology – Data interchange on 12,7 mm, 112-track magnetic tape cartridges – DLT 2 format
 ISO/IEC 13963:1995 Information technology - Data interchange on 90 mm optical disk cartridges - Capacity: 230 megabytes per cartridge
 ISO 13969:2003 Milk and milk products – Guidelines for a standardized description of microbial inhibitor tests
 ISO 13970:2011 Recreational diving services – Requirements for the training of recreational snorkelling guides
 ISO/TS 13972:2015 Health informatics – Detailed clinical models, characteristics and processes
 ISO/TR 13973:2014 Artificial recharge to groundwater
 ISO 13990 Textile machinery and accessories – Yarn feeders and yarn control for knitting machines
 ISO 13990-1:2006 Part 1: Vocabulary

Notes

References

External links 
 International Organization for Standardization
 ISO Certification Provider
 ISO Consultant

International Organization for Standardization